Edenville may refer to:

 Edenville, Free State, South Africa
 Edenville, Michigan, United States
 Edenville Township, Michigan, United States

See also
 Edanville, Missouri